The 2005 ACB Playoffs was the postseason of the 2004–05 ACB season. Consisting of 8 teams best classified, the playoffs involved over a two weeks of play and more than 20 games overall. The playoffs were conducted in 3-game series, with the team with the better record holding home court advantage. Real Madrid won the 2005 ACB Playoffs by defeating the defending champions, TAU Cerámica, 3-2 in the ACB Finals.

Note: winner is noted in bold.

Quarter finals
(1) TAU Cerámica vs. (8) Gran Canaria:
TAU Vitoria win series 3-1 
Game 1 @ Vitoria: TAU Vitoria 90, Gran Canaria 61 
Game 2 @ Gran Canaria: Gran Canaria 72, TAU Vitoria 64 
Game 3 @ Vitoria: TAU Vitoria 75, Gran Canaria 64 
Game 4 @ Gran Canaria: Gran Canaria 66, TAU Vitoria 68 

(4) Unicaja Málaga vs. (5) Etosa Alicante:
Unicaja win series 3-2
Game 1 @ Malaga: Unicaja Malaga 60, Etosa Alicante 65 
Game 2 @ Alicante: Etosa Alicante 94, Unicaja Malaga 75 
Game 3 @ Malaga: Unicaja Malaga 81, Etosa Alicante 74 
Game 4 @ Alicante: Etosa Alicante 56, Unicaja Malaga 60 
Game 5 @ Malaga: Unicaja Malaga 71, Etosa Alicante 69 

(2) Real Madrid vs. (7) DKV Joventut:
Real Madrid win series 3-1
Game 1 @ Madrid: Real Madrid 74, Joventut Badalona 71 
Game 2 @ Badalona: Joventut Badalona 79, Real Madrid 66 
Game 3 @ Madrid: Real Madrid 90, Joventut Badalona 70 
Game 4 @ Badalona: Joventut Badalona 72, Real Madrid 81 

(6) Adecco Estudiantes vs. (3) Winterthur FC Barcelona:
Adecco Estudiantes win series 3-1
Game 1 @ Barcelona: Winterthur Barcelona 73, Adecco Estudiantes 74 
Game 2 @ Madrid: Adecco Estudiantes 78, Winterthur 57 
Game 3 @ Barcelona: Winterthur Barcelona 83, Adecco Estudiantes 79 
Game 4 @ Madrid: Adecco Estudiantes 81, Winterthur Barcelona 63

Semi finals
(1) TAU Cerámica vs. (4) Unicaja Málaga:
TAU Vitoria win series 3-1
Game 1 @ Vitoria: TAU Vitoria 72, Unicaja Malaga 63 
Game 2 @ Vitoria: TAU Vitoria 64, Unicaja Malaga 53 
Game 3 @ Malaga: Unicaja Malaga 95, TAU Vitoria 92 
Game 4 @ Malaga: Unicaja Malaga 62, TAU Vitoria 74 

(2) Real Madrid vs. (6) Adecco Estudiantes:
Real Madrid wins series 3-1
Game 1 @ Madrid (Home RM): Real Madrid 81, Adecco Estudiantes 64 
Game 2 @ Madrid (Home RM): Real Madrid 67, Adecco Estudiantes 89 
Game 3 @ Madrid (Home AE): Adecco Estudiantes 84, Real Madrid 85 
Game 4 @ Madrid (Home AE): Adecco Estudiantes 68, Real Madrid 74

ACB Finals
(2) Real Madrid vs. (1) TAU Cerámica:
Real Madrid win series 3-2
Game 1 @ Vitoria: TAU Vitoria 82, Real Madrid 84 
Game 2 @ Vitoria: TAU Vitoria 74, Real Madrid 68 
Game 3 @ Madrid: Real Madrid 82, TAU Vitoria 83 
Game 4 @ Madrid: Real Madrid 88, TAU Vitoria 82 
Game 5 @ Vitoria: TAU Vitoria 69, Real Madrid 70 

REAL MADRID: 2004/2005 ACB CHAMPION

MVP:  Louis Bullock

The Finals were broadcast in Spain on RTVE. For a list of international broadcasters see the acb international TV site .

External links
ACB.com's section for the 2005 ACB Playoffs 

Liga ACB playoffs
Playoffs